William Luther Kealii Moehonua (1824–1878) was a native Hawaiian noble and politician in the Kingdom of Hawaii.

Life
William Luther Moehonua was born May 5, 1824, in Mokulēia. His mother was Mary Napuaelua. There is some dispute about his father. Some sources give it as Chief Keaweamahi.
Others say his father was Aikanaka (1790–1868), who had slept with his mother about the same time.
Around 1848 he married Kaunuohua, a noble who was attendant to King Kamehameha IV.
On September 11, 1849 he married Lucy Muolo who died in 1865, and remarried to Kapeka Kahele in 1875.
His probable half-sister Analea Keohokālole became a civil leader in her own right.

On February 6, 1873 Moehonua was given the rank of Major in the royal guard of King Lunalilo.
On September 10, 1873, Moehonua was put in command of ʻIolani Barracks after a mutiny against their Hungarian-born commander.
He was elected to the Legislature of the Hawaiian Kingdom of 1874 as a representative for Oahu island.

Lunalilo died after reigning for only one year without naming an heir, so the legislature according to the constitution was to elect a new king. Moehonua and Samuel Gardner Wilder counted the ballots and announced the results. The winner was Kalākaua, who was probably a nephew since Kalākaua's grandfather Aikanaka was (probably) Moehonua's father. Moehonua was injured when his carriage was torn apart in the protests that followed, since Queen Emma of Hawaii was favored by the Hawaiian people.
On April 27, 1874 he was promoted to rank of Colonel. On October 31, 1874 he was appointed minister of the interior, until December 5, 1876 when he was replaced by John Mott-Smith. He became commissioner of the crown lands November 20, 1875.

On December 15, 1876 Moehonua was appointed  Royal Governor of Maui. 
On April 15, 1878 he was appointed to the upper House of Nobles of the legislature.
He died September 8, 1878. He was replaced as Maui governor by  John Owen Dominis, who was married to Lydia Kamakaeha, later Queen Liliuokalani. He was granted much land for his service, although some had to be sold to satisfy his debts by executor Charles T. Gulick. 
He probably had at least one child: Kalākaua filed a lawsuit which reached the supreme court in 1883, claiming some land that G. W. Keaweamahi had inherited from Moehonua. The court ruled against the king.
In her autobiography, Liliuokalani, who may have been unaware or indifferent, downplays his family background, not mentioning if they were related:He was a most estimable man, far superior to many of a corresponding rank, which was not of the highest; yet he was a good specimen of the Hawaiian race, of noble birth and patriotic sentiments.

References 

1824 births
1878 deaths
Royalty of the Hawaiian Kingdom
Hawaiian Kingdom politicians
Members of the Hawaiian Kingdom Privy Council
Members of the Hawaiian Kingdom House of Representatives
Governors of Maui
Hawaiian Kingdom Interior Ministers
Members of the Hawaiian Kingdom House of Nobles
Hawaiian Kingdom chamberlains
19th-century American politicians
Hawaiian Kingdom military officers